Irschick is a surname. Notable people with the surname include: 

Duncan Irschick (born 1969), American evolutionary ecologist
Eugene F. Irschick, American historian